Kim is a rural locality (a selo) in Aksyonovsky Selsoviet, Alsheyevsky District, Bashkortostan, Russia. The population was 878 as of 2010. There are 10 streets.

Geography 
Kim is located 36 km southwest of Rayevsky (the district's administrative centre) by road. Aksyonovo is the nearest rural locality.

References 

Rural localities in Alsheyevsky District